Ezequiel Scarione (born 14 July 1985) is an Argentine footballer who most recently played as a midfielder for Turkish Süper Lig club Ankaragücü.

Club career
Scarione began his career Boca Juniors and was promoted to the first team in 2002. In 2004 he transferred to Deportivo Cuenca. Scarione left Deportivo Cuenca in 2006 and moved to Switzerland-based club FC Thun where he played 42 games and scored 7 goals. On 8 January 2009, he joined FC Luzern on loan. In July 2009 he returned to Switzerland signing with St. Gallen to play in the 2009–10 season in the Swiss Challenge League, winning the Championship and achieving immediate promotion to the Swiss Super League for the 2010–11 season.

On 12 July 2016, Scarione signed for Maccabi Tel Aviv on a free transfer.

In July 2017, Scarione signed a contract with Göztepe in Turkey.

On 31 January 2019, Scarione joined Süper Lig side Ankaragücü on a four-month deal. He made his debut for Ankaragücü in a 3–0 home win against Kasımpaşa on 11 February 2019.

International career
In 2006, Scarione played for the Argentina national under-20 football team.

References

External links

1985 births
Living people
People from José C. Paz Partido
Association football midfielders
Argentine footballers
Argentina under-20 international footballers
Boca Juniors footballers
C.D. Cuenca footballers
FC Thun players
FC Luzern players
FC St. Gallen players
Kasımpaşa S.K. footballers
Maccabi Tel Aviv F.C. players
Göztepe S.K. footballers
Argentine Primera División players
Swiss Super League players
Swiss Challenge League players
Süper Lig players
Israeli Premier League players
Argentine expatriate footballers
Expatriate footballers in Ecuador
Argentine expatriate sportspeople in Ecuador
Expatriate footballers in Switzerland
Argentine expatriate sportspeople in Switzerland
Expatriate footballers in Turkey
Argentine expatriate sportspeople in Turkey
Expatriate footballers in Israel
Argentine expatriate sportspeople in Israel
Sportspeople from Buenos Aires Province